Saint Gerard of Potenza, also Gerard La Porta (Gerardo La Porta) (d. 30 October 1119) was a Roman Catholic saint and a bishop of Potenza in Italy.

Life 
Gerard was born in Piacenza into a noble family. He travelled into southern Italy in search of holy sites, but when he reached Potenza he decided to dedicate himself to the apostolic life. Such was his drive that when the bishop died, the people and clergy chose Gerard as his successor. He was proclaimed bishop at Acerenza and was in post for eight years.

After Gerard's death Pope Callixtus II declared him a saint viva voce in 1120. His relics are kept in a sarcophagus in Potenza Cathedral, which is dedicated to him.

Veneration 
Saint Gerard's principal feast day is 30 May, the day of the translation of his relics; 30 October, the day of his death, is also kept.

References

Sources 
Santi e Beati: San Gerardo di Potenza 

Medieval Italian saints
Bishops in Basilicata
People from Potenza
People from Piacenza
1118 deaths
Year of birth unknown